Arturo Harmodio Deliser Espinosa (born 24 April 1997 in Colón) is a Panamanian sprinter.

Career 

In 2014, he competed in the boys' 100 metres event at the 2014 Summer Youth Olympics held in Nanjing, China.

Deliser won both the 100 and 200 metres at the 2012 South American Youth Championships in Athletics in Mendoza, Argentina.

Personal life 
Arturo spent some time in Pomona, California studying English at the Cal Poly Pomona English Language Institute where he was highlighted as a spotlight student. He eventually transferred to a local community college to pursue his studies and joined their track team.

Personal bests
100 m: 10.56 s (wind: -1.0 m/s) –  Cali, 17 May 2014
200 m: 21.11 s (wind: 0.0 m/s) –  Cali, 29 November 2014

Achievements

References

External links

IAAF profile for Arturo Deliser

1997 births
Living people
Panamanian male sprinters
Sportspeople from Panama City
Athletes (track and field) at the 2014 Summer Youth Olympics
20th-century Panamanian people
21st-century Panamanian people